Dara O Briain's Go 8 Bit is a British comedy panel game show, hosted by comedian Dara Ó Briain, co-starring video game journalist Ellie Gibson, and premiered on Dave on 5 September 2016. The show's format is themed around two teams – English comedians Steve McNeil and Sam Pamphilon as team captains, along with a guest member for each team – competing in a series of rounds against each other for points through various video games. Games featured in the programme ranged from past classic, modern releases and indie games, as well as a specially designed round themed on a particular game. The winner of each episode is the team to secure the most points after five rounds, with the number of points determined by an audience vote.

The show was originally conceived by McNeil and Pamphilon for the 2013 Edinburgh Festival Fringe, before it was later pitched for television in 2016. After the first series, UKTV commissioned two more series of the programme, allowing viewers to watch a new episode via their on-demand service UKTV Play, a week before it would be broadcast on Dave. The show spawned a spin-off show, entitled Go 8 Bit DLC and presented by Gibson, McNeil and Pamphilon, that was aired alongside each episode of the second series, and also featured a one-hour special, entitled The Best of Dara O Briain's Go 8 Bit and aired on 5 February 2018, featuring the best bits of series 1 and 2.

On 28 September 2018, following the conclusion of the third series, UKTV cancelled production on Dara O Briain's Go 8 Bit, though at present it has not ruled out a return of the programme.

Origins
In 2013, McNeil and Pamphilon began work to devise a show they would perform for the Edinburgh Festival Fringe that year. The comedians had very little on ideas for what they would create, but eventually settled on the idea of using video games to create humour. Their concept, entitled McNeil & Pamphilon Go 8-Bit!, focused on them leading teams that competed against each other via playing video games, with the loser having to take a forfeit. Examples of forfeits that occurred included McNeil being punched, and Pamphilon eating a whole jar of jalapeño peppers. When interviewed by The Guardian about the concept they created, McNeil explained the reasoning behind their idea:

"We'd had the idea of doing a late night show on Friday and Saturday nights, just for fun, where we'd get comedians drunk and then encourage them to abuse each other while they played retro games – purely for shenanigans. Somewhat tediously, it was more successful than anything else we'd done up to that point. So we kept doing it."

While the show's popularity led to it featuring on the Fringe the following year,  the concept was seen to have potential. The television rights were optioned by production company DLT Entertainment UK Limited, who assigned producer Rohan Acharya to develop its format for television. The basic development of the programme established a budget that allowed six episodes to be produced as a sales tool, with a presentation of the televised concept performed at The Tabernacle in 2014. After watching the presentation, Dave gave the green light to supporting the show and taking on its six episodes, a decision that was further assisted by Dara Ó Briain agreeing to become the show's host; his attachment to it led to the show's name changing to become Dara O Briain's Go 8 Bit. To assist in its development on Dave, Darren Sole was brought on as Series Producer. When the show was given a live performance in a London pub, Ellie Gibson became immediately interested in what she saw and auditioned for a role on the programme as a gaming expert, which she subsequently secured.

Format
The show focuses on comedians McNeil and Pamphilon as the captain of their own team, with each episode seeing them joined by a guest teammate. The goal for both teams is to secure the most points after five rounds of competitive gaming. The rules for each round vary, depending on the game being played and the mode of gameplay used – for example, the rules could state that the teams have to maintain the highest score when the allotted playing time is up, while in another game, the rules could stipulate that it is the best of five matches to determine the winner and team members switch controllers after each match. While Gibson provides overall information on each game that is played by the teams, in a humorous style, along with the rules for winning each round, both she and Ó Briain also provide commentary when a game is underway.

The main stage used for the show, where the host, expert and teams are situated on, features a special mechanism which allows it to move 90 degrees clockwise and anticlockwise between two positions – the "Play" position, which faces the teams towards a large screen used for the majority of rounds to play video games on, except for the final round, in which they face a special stage to play a unique game on it; and the "Rest" position, used between rounds. Both teams each sit at a couch for the duration of the show, except the final round, with each having a desk space set in front of them that is laden with various console controllers and a keyboard and mouse, depending on the choice of games being used. In some cases where the teams are playing an arcade video game, an arcade machine of the game is set up on the stage.

Each episode consists of five rounds that are played as follows:

 Round 1 – A classic video game played by both teams. In this round, members of both team switch play when the current player is "KOed" during gameplay.
 Round 2 & 3 – The favourite game of each guest. The guest that is playing, competes against the opposing team's captain.
 Round 4 – A modern indie game or a big hit game, played by both teams.
 Round 5 – A humorous take on a game, done up with life-size controller scheme, and played in a special stage area behind the screen. The game usually involves the guests playing this.

The team that wins a round receives a set number of points that are determined before it begins via an audience vote. Prior to each episode, the audience are given log-in details to a voting app they can use on their phone. When a round is set to commence, the audience are asked to vote on the team they believe will win it, with voting ended upon the stage set to the Play position. The highest percentage value from the vote tally, becomes the points that are on offer for the winning team – for example, if the vote ends with team A getting 36% of the vote, and team B getting 64% of the vote, then the winner of the round will receive 64 points. For the final round, the number of points on offer is doubled. In the event of a tie, both teams receive points based on the number for the round.

Episodes

Series Overview

The coloured backgrounds denote the result of each of the shows:

 – indicates Steve's team won
 – indicates Sam's team won

Series 1 (2016)

Series 2 (2017)

Series 3 (2018)

Scores

Ratings 
Episode viewing figures from BARB.

Series 1

Series 2

Series 3

References

External links
 
 
 
 

2016 British television series debuts
2018 British television series endings
2010s British game shows
British panel games
Dave (TV channel) original programming
English-language television shows
Television shows about video games
Video gaming in the United Kingdom
Television shows shot at BBC Elstree Centre